Kothandaramar Temple is a Hindu temple located in the Tiruvarur district of Tamil Nadu, India, dedicated to Lord Rama, the seventh avatar of Lord Vishnu.

Location
It is located in the village of Thillaivilagam in Thiruthiraipoondi taluk. It is located at a distance of 20 km from the town of Thiruthuraipoondi.

Presiding deity

The presiding deity is known as Kothandaramar and also Veera Kothandaramar. There are also Sita, Lakshmanan and Hanuman.

Speciality

Lord Hanuman with four feet height, in standing posture, is the speciality of the temple. We can even see the vain on lord Rama's feet, also the Arrow end is different from the others.

Religious significance 

This temple is one of the *Pancha Rama Kshetrams and considered the foremost among the five temples. Pancha means five and Kshetrams refers to holy places. All the five temples are situated in Tiruvarur district, Tamil Nadu. 

 Sri Kodhanda Ramar Temple, Mudikondan
 Sri Kodhanda Ramar Temple, Adambar
 Sri Ramar Temple, Paruthiyur   
 Sri Kodhanda Ramar Temple, Thillaivilagam
 Sri Kodhanda Ramar Temple, Vaduvur

References 

 Pancha Rama Kshetras

External links

 Pancha Rama Kshetras
Sarvam Rama Mayam
Sthala Puranam
 

Hindu temples in Tiruvarur district
Vishnu temples
Rama temples